Jasmina Keber (born November 26, 1988) is a triple World Champion and double European Champion crossminton player from Slovenia.

After winning a silver medal at the first ICO Crossminton World Championships in 2011, Jasmina Keber won the European Champion title at the European Championships in 2012, both in female singles category. In 2013, she became World Champion for the first time and in 2014 she successfully defended her European Champion title. In 2015, she successfully defended her World Champion title. Her third World Champion title was won in 2019. In 2021 she won the World Champion title in Women's doubles and finished second in singles.

In January 2012 she became Nr. 1 ranked player in the ICO female singles world ranking and in July 2013 she became Nr. 1 ranked player in the ICO doubles world ranking too. In the period of 2010-2022 she won 51 ICO World Series and 36 ICO Cup singles tournaments and 22 ICO World Series and 18 cup doubles tournaments. She currently resides in Radeče, Slovenia.

Career

2019 
A slow attempt to return to competitive crossminton started by only playing mixed doubles matches in the first half of the year. In preparation for the World Championships Jasmina Keber won the Austrian Open, after which she won her third World Champion title in Budapest in July. In September, she won Serbian Open and Czech Open, and in November she won Spanish Open.

2018 
Jasmina Keber started the 2018 season with a victory at Slovenian Open, followed by a victory at Hungarian Open. A back injury forced her to end the season already in the beginning of May and then also to withdraw from the European Championships.

2017 
Following the birth of a daughter, Jasmina Keber returned to playing competitive crossminton by winning Croatian Open in May and Hungarian Open in June. At the World Championships in Warsaw Keber lost in the quarterfinals against Janet Köhler, while in mixed doubles she won bronze medal in pair with Matjaž Šušteršič. In the second part of the year, Keber won the German, Serbian and Mauritian Open.

2016 
2016 season started with a victory at Slovenian Open, followed by victories at Polish Open, Croatian Open and Hungarian Open. The highlight of the season was the European Championships in Brest, France, where she finished in 3rd place in both singles and mixed doubles categories after injuring her ankle in the female singles category quarterfinals match. Immediately after the tournament Jasmina Keber announced the end of her season due to pregnancy.

2015 
New season brought some tournament mode changes, splitting the World Series tournaments into 1.000 points and 500 points tournaments. Nonetheless, the season started with a victory at Slovenian Open, followed by a defeat in the final of Hungarian Open and victories at Slovak Open and Croatian Open. At the World Championship in Berlin Jasmina Keber won gold in female singles category and silver in mixed doubles category. In October, Slovenian national team, consisting of Jasmina Keber, Samo Lipuscek, Robi Titovsek and Matjaz Sustersic won the ICO Nations Cup Final Tournament in Eragny, France. Victories at Swiss Open and Japanese Open followed in the last two months of the year.

2014 
Having suffered only one defeat in singles matches in 2013, 2014 season started with a surprising defeat in the final of Slovenian Open, followed by victories at Hungarian Open, Slovak Open, Dutch Open, Croatian Open and Serbian Open. At European Championship in Warsaw Jasmina Keber won gold in female singles category and silver in mixed doubles category. Another successful season with only one defeat in singles matches was rounded up with a victory at Czech Open.

2013 
In January Jasmina Keber won the Slovenian Open for the third consecutive time, which was followed by victories at Hungarian Open in March, French Open and Slovak Open in May, Croatian Open in June, Dutch Open and Ukrainian Open in July and Portuguese Open in September.
World Championships 2013 took place mid-June in Berlin. After winning a bronze medal in mixed doubles in pair with Matjaž Šušteršič, Jasmina Keber secured the title of World Champion in female singles category by winning an incredible final match against Marta Sołtys of Poland, thus achieving the biggest success of her career. 
In July, Jasmina Keber became the first player in the history of speed badminton to simultaneously hold the titles of current World Champion, European Champion, No. 1 ranked player in singles and No. 1 ranked player in doubles category.

2012 
Another perfect start into new season saw Jasmina Keber take over the Nr. 1 spot in the world rankings and repeat the victories at Slovenian Open, Croatian Open and Serbian Open. She also added victories at Slovak Open, Ukrainian Open and Czech Open to her tally, while finishing 2nd at Portuguese Open and Swiss Open, thus making a 3rd place at Hungarian Open her worst result of the year.
European Championships 2012 took place in Poreč, Croatia. As Nr. 1 seeded player in female category Jasmina Keber won the final match against Agnes Darnyik from Hungary and the title of European Champion. In addition, she finished 2nd in female doubles category with Helena Halas and 3rd in mixed doubles with Matjaž Šušteršič, thus becoming the most successful female player at European Championships 2012.

2011 
A perfect start into 2011 season with her maiden victory (Slovenian Open) at ICO World Series tournaments was followed by victories at Serbian Open, Croatian Open and Hungarian Open with only defeat sustained in the final match of Slovak Open against Marta Sołtys from Poland.
The first ICO Crossminton (at that time still named speed badminton) World Championships took place in August at Steffi Graf stadium in Berlin, Germany. As 3rd seeded player she lost a tightly contested final match against Janet Köhler from Germany, thus winning the title of vice-champion of the world.

World championships

2021 - Zagreb

2019 - Budapest

2017 - Warsaw

2015 - Berlin

2013 - Berlin

2011 - Berlin

European Championships

2016 - Brest

2014 - Warsaw

2012 - Poreč

Tournament finals

Singles

Doubles

References

External links 
Z loparjem tudi v Burkina Faso in na Haiti
Jasmina Keber: official ICO biography
Jasmina Keber at Team Speedminton
ICO World Rankings

Living people
1988 births